Researchgruppen is a Swedish network of independent journalists founded 2009. The organisation behind the network is Seppuku Media Ekonomisk Förening. The group's members have been described as people belonging to the autonom extreme left. In a radio documentary for Sveriges radio the group members are also said to have a history with violence.

Awards 

 2014: Six members of the network was nominated a Guldspade
 2014: Stora Journalistpriset

References 

Swedish journalists